Chebei Station is a station of Guangzhou Metro Line 4. It is located at the underground of the junction of Chebei Road and Zhongshan Avenue (zh) in Tianhe District. It started operation on 25 September 2010.

Station layout

Exits

References

Railway stations in China opened in 2010
Guangzhou Metro stations in Tianhe District